Kurcheh Posht (also Romanized as Kūrcheh Posht; also known as Gowrjeh Posht, Korjā Posht, Korjā-ye Posht, Korjehposht, and Kvorjeh Posht) is a village in Reza Mahalleh Rural District, in the Central District of Rudsar County, Gilan Province, Iran. At the 2006 census, its population was 842, in 233 families.

References 

Populated places in Rudsar County